Martin Švestka (born 27 June 1977) is a Czech football defender who currently plays for club FC Vítkovice.

References

External links
at banikratiskovice.banda.cz
at fcvitkovice.cz

1977 births
Living people
Czech footballers
Association football defenders
SK Sigma Olomouc players
FK Drnovice players
FK Dubnica players
MŠK Žilina players
ŠK Slovan Bratislava players
MFK Vítkovice players
Czech First League players
Slovak Super Liga players